EmbroidMe is a U.S based franchise that specializes in custom embroidery and screen printing. It is part of the United Franchise Group. The company was founded in 2000 by Ray Titus who launched the first store in West Palm Beach. EmbroidMe has over 250 units across the world, with regional offices in the United States and Australia. Other locations include Bahamas, Canada, England, Mexico, New Zealand, Nicaragua, South Africa and Trinadad and Tobago.

Overview
EmbroidMe provides customized apparel and products. The company’s services include garment printing, embroidery, personalized gifts and promotional products.

The company's headquarters is located in West Palm Beach, Florida. EmbroidMe offers promotional products and services such as monogramming. The company’s list of products includes corporate apparel, shirts, uniforms and other clothing. Products are sold through the company’s many retail outlets across the world.

EmbroidMe was ranked 72nd in Entrepreneur’s 2008 fastest growing franchise list. In 2010, the Advertising Speciality Institute listed EmbroidMe among the top 40 promotional product distributors in North America based on the company's sales. EmbroidMe was ranked 421st on the 2011 Franchise 500 list. The company grew by 86 spots and was ranked 336th in the updated 2012 Entrepreneur Franchise 500 list.

History

2000 – Founded by Ray Titus
2002 – Company opens its 50th store.
2002 – Company launches its first foreign store
2004 – Company launches is first franchise store in Australia
2004 – Company opens its 200th store
2006 – Ranked 20th on ASI Top 40 distributor list *2006 - EmbroidMe is ranked 1st in the Embroidery Category by Entrepreneur Magazine.
2006 – Company begins expansion into New Zealand and the United Kingdom.
2007 – Ranked 21st on ASI Top 40 distributor list
2007 – Ray Titus wins 2007 Ernst and Young Entrepreneur of the Year
2008 – Ranked 18th on ASI Top 40 distributor list
2008 – Ranked 72nd in Entrepreneur.com Fastest-Growing Franchises list
2009 – Ranked 18th on ASI Top 40 distributor list
2011 – Ranked 19th on ASI Top 40 distributor list
2011 – National Network of Embroidery Professionals ranks the company 28th in a publication 
2017 - Company changes name to Fully Promoted
highlighting the '75 most powerful people and companies in the industry'

Membership
Advertising Speciality Institute
Promotional product association
National Sporting Goods Association
National Network of Embroidery Professionals
International Franchise Association

References

Further reading

External links 
Company's Official History Page
Company's Franchise Site

Manufacturing companies based in Florida
Companies based in Palm Beach County, Florida
Manufacturing companies established in 2000
2000 establishments in Florida
Embroidery